Time periods in the region of Palestine summarizes the major time periods in the history of the region of Palestine/Land of Israel, and notes the major events in each time period.

See also
 Archaeology of Israel
 History of ancient Israel and Judah
 History of the Jews and Judaism in the Land of Israel
 History of Palestine (region)
 Prehistory of the Levant
 Timeline of the name Palestine
 Timeline of the Palestine region

References

01
01
Land of Israel
Palestine (region)
01